When in Rome 2007 is a live DVD by British rock band Genesis recorded at Circus Maximus, Rome, Italy, on 14 July 2007, during the Turn It On Again Tour. The concert was directed by David Mallet. The collection was released on 26 May 2008 in most of the world and 10 June 2008 in North America. During its initial release in the United States, it was available exclusively via the band's website, or through Walmart and Sam's Club retail and online stores. Since November 2009, it has been available in regular outlets and online stores in the United States.

A hi-definition release on Blu-ray and HD DVD was announced initially on the release of the corresponding CD Live over Europe 2007. An HD DVD release did not happen due to the demise of the format, and the record company decided there was not a sufficient market for a Blu-ray release.

The DVD was not included in the Genesis Movie Box 1981–2007 due to Nick Davis convincing the record company that fans were displeased with the prospect of buying When in Rome 2007 twice. Therefore, the box set contains an empty jewel case into which two of the three DVDs from When in Rome 2007 can be inserted to complete the box, the third DVD (the Come Rain or Shine documentary) can be housed in an empty slot in the bonus wallet.

The DVD includes a 28-page booklet. Audio options are DTS (24bit/96k) 5.1 surround sound, Dolby Digital (24bit/48k) 5.1 surround sound & Dolby Digital (24bit/48k) 2.0 stereo.

The estimated attendance for the concert was 500,000.

Track listing

DVD 1

DVD 2

DVD 3

Credits 
Phil Collins – lead vocals, drums, percussion, stool
Mike Rutherford – 6 and 12-string guitars, bass, bass pedals, backing vocals
Tony Banks – keyboards, backing vocals

with

Daryl Stuermer – guitars, bass, bass pedals, backing vocals
Chester Thompson – drums, percussion, stool

Charts

Weekly charts

Certifications

Release history

References

External links 
 Genesis Official Site
 UK Promotional Site for "When in Rome"

Genesis (band) video albums
2008 live albums
2008 video albums
Live video albums
Virgin Records live albums
Genesis (band) live albums
Virgin Records video albums
Music videos directed by David Mallet (director)